Julian Lincoln Simon (February 12, 1932 – February 8, 1998) was an American professor of business administration at the University of Maryland and a Senior Fellow at the Cato Institute at the time of his death, after previously serving as a longtime economics and business professor at the University of Illinois at Urbana-Champaign.

Simon wrote many books and articles, mostly on economic subjects. He is best known for his work on population, natural resources, and immigration. Simon is sometimes associated with cornucopian views. Rather than focus on the abundance of nature, Simon focused on lasting economic benefits from continuous population growth, even despite limited or finite physical resources, empowered primarily by human ingenuity which would create substitutes, and technological progress.

He is also known for the famous Simon–Ehrlich wager, a bet he made with ecologist Paul R. Ehrlich. Ehrlich bet that the prices for five metals would increase over a decade, while Simon took the opposite stance. Simon won the bet, as the prices for the metals sharply declined during that decade.

Theory
Simon's 1981 book The Ultimate Resource is a criticism of what was then the conventional wisdom on resource scarcity, published within the context of the cultural background created by the best-selling and highly influential book The Population Bomb in 1968 by Paul R. Ehrlich and The Limits to Growth analysis published in 1972. The Ultimate Resource challenged the conventional wisdom on population growth, raw-material scarcity and resource consumption. Simon argues that our notions of increasing resource scarcity ignore the long-term declines in wage-adjusted raw material prices. Viewed economically, he argues, increasing wealth and technology make more resources available; although supplies may be limited physically they may be regarded as economically indefinite as old resources are recycled and new alternatives are assumed to be developed by the market. Simon challenged the notion of an impending Malthusian catastrophe—that an increase in population has negative economic consequences; that population is a drain on natural resources; and that we stand at risk of running out of resources through over-consumption. Simon argues that population is the solution to resource scarcities and environmental problems, since people and markets innovate. His ideas were praised by Nobel Laureate economists Friedrich Hayek and Milton Friedman, the latter in a 1998 foreword to The Ultimate Resource II, but they have also attracted critics such as Paul R. Ehrlich, Albert Allen Bartlett and Herman Daly.

Simon examined different raw materials, especially metals and their prices in historical times. He assumed that besides temporary shortfalls, in the long run prices for raw materials remain at similar levels or even decrease. E.g. aluminium was never as expensive as before 1886 and steel used for medieval armor carried a much higher price tag in current dollars than any modern parallel. A recent discussion of commodity index long-term trends supported his positions.

His 1984 book The Resourceful Earth (co-edited by Herman Kahn), is a similar criticism of the conventional wisdom on population growth and resource consumption and a direct response to the Global 2000 report. For example, it predicted that "There is no compelling reason to believe that world oil prices will rise in the coming decades. In fact, prices may well fall below current levels". Indeed, oil prices trended downward for nearly the next 2 decades, before rising above 1984 levels in about 2003 or 2004. Oil prices have subsequently risen and fallen, and risen again. In 2008, the price of crude oil reached $100 per barrel, a level last attained in the 1860s (inflation adjusted). Later in 2008, the price again sharply fell, to a low of about $40, before rising again to a high around $125. Since mid-2011, prices were slowly trending downward until the middle of 2014, but falling dramatically until the end of 2015 to ca. $30. Since then prices were relatively stable (below $50).

Simon was skeptical, in 1994, of claims that human activity caused global environmental damage, notably in relation to CFCs, ozone depletion and climate change.

Simon also claimed that numerous environmental damage and health dangers from pollution were "definitely disproved". These included lead pollution & IQ, DDT, PCBs, malathion, Agent Orange, asbestos, and the chemical contamination at Love Canal.  He dismissed such concerns as a mere "value judgement."

Influence
Simon was one of the founders of free-market environmentalism.
An article entitled "The Doomslayer" profiling Julian Simon in Wired magazine inspired Danish Bjørn Lomborg to write the book The Skeptical Environmentalist.

Simon was also the first to suggest that airlines should provide incentives for travelers to give up their seats on overbooked flights, rather than arbitrarily taking random passengers off the plane (a practice known as "bumping"). Although the airline industry initially rejected it, his plan was later implemented with resounding success, as recounted by Milton Friedman in the foreword to The Ultimate Resource II. Economist James Heins said in 2009 that the practice had added $100 billion to the United States economy in the last 30 years. Simon gave away his idea to federal de-regulators and never received any personal profit from his solution.

Although not all of Simon's arguments were universally accepted, they contributed to a shift in opinion in the literature on demographic economics from a strongly Malthusian negative view of population growth to a more neutral view. More recent theoretical developments, based on the ideas of the demographic dividend and demographic window, have contributed to another shift, this time away from the debate viewing population growth as either good or bad.

Simon wrote a memoir, A Life Against the Grain, which was published by his wife after his death.

Wagers with rivals

Paul R. Ehrlich – first wager

Simon challenged Paul R. Ehrlich to a wager in 1980 over the price of metals a decade later; Simon had been challenging environmental scientists to the bet for some time. Ehrlich, John Harte, and John Holdren selected a basket of five metals that they thought would rise in price with increasing scarcity and depletion. Simon won the bet, with all five metals dropping in price.

Supporters of Ehrlich's position suggest that much of this price drop came because of an oil spike driving prices up in 1980 and a recession driving prices down in 1990, pointing out that the price of the basket of metals actually rose from 1950 to 1975. They also suggest that Ehrlich did not consider the prices of these metals to be critical indicators, and that Ehrlich took the bet with great reluctance. On the other hand, Ehrlich selected the metals to be used himself, and at the time of the bet called it an "astonishing offer" that he was accepting "before other greedy people jump in."

The total supply in three of these metals (chromium, copper and nickel) increased during this time. Prices also declined for reasons specific to each of the five:
 The price of tin went down because of an increased use of aluminium, a much more abundant, useful and inexpensive material.
 Better mining technologies allowed for the discovery of vast nickel lodes, which ended the near monopoly that was enjoyed on the market.
 Tungsten fell due to the rise of the use of ceramics in cookware.
 The price of chromium fell due to better smelting techniques.
 The price of copper began to fall due to the invention of fiber optic cable (which is derived from sand), which serves a number of the functions once reserved only for copper wire.

In all of these cases, better technology allowed for either more efficient use of existing resources, or substitution with a more abundant and less expensive resource, as Simon predicted.

Paul R. Ehrlich – proposed second wager
In 1995, Simon issued a challenge for a second bet. Ehrlich declined, and proposed instead that they bet on a metric for human welfare. Ehrlich offered Simon a set of 15 metrics over 10 years, victor to be determined by scientists chosen by the president of the National Academy of Sciences in 2005. There was no meeting of minds, because Simon felt that too many of the metric's measured attributes of the world were not directly related to human welfare, e.g. the amount of nitrous oxide in the atmosphere. For such indirect, supposedly bad indicators to be considered "bad", they would ultimately have to have some measurable detrimental effect on actual human welfare. Ehrlich refused to leave out measures considered by Simon to be immaterial.

Simon summarized the bet with the following analogy:

David South
The same year as his second challenge to Ehrlich, Simon also began a wager with David South, professor of the Auburn University School of Forestry. The Simon / South wager concerned timber prices. Consistent with his cornucopian analysis of this issue in The Ultimate Resource, Simon wagered that at the end of a five-year term the consumer price of pine timber would have decreased; South wagered that it would increase. Before five years had elapsed, Simon saw that market and extra-market forces were driving up the price of timber, and he paid Professor South $1,000. Simon died before the agreed-upon date of the end of the bet, by which time timber prices had risen further.

Simon's reasoning for his early exit out of the bet was due to "the far-reaching quantity and price effects of logging restrictions in the Pacific-northwest." He believed this counted as interference from the U.S. government, which rendered the bet worthless according to his economic principles. Simon's bet only considered the possibility of prices being driven up by Alabama's government; he did not believe anything worthwhile was shown when U.S. logging restrictions drove the prices up.

Criticism 
Jared Diamond in his book Collapse, Albert Bartlett and Garrett Hardin describe Simon as being too optimistic and some of his assumptions being not in line with natural limitations.

Diamond claims that a continued stable growth rate of earth's population would result in extreme over-population long before the suggested time limit. Regarding the attributed population predictions Simon did not specify that he was assuming a fixed growth rate as Diamond, Bartlett and Hardin have done. Simon argued that people do not become poorer as the population expands; increasing numbers produce what they needed to support themselves, and have and will prosper while food prices sink.

Diamond believes, and finds absurd, Simon implies it would be possible to produce metals, e.g. copper, from other elements. For Simon, human resource needs are comparably small compared to the wealth of nature. He therefore argued physical limitations play a minor role and shortages of raw materials tend to be local and temporary. The main scarcity pointed out by Simon is the amount of human brain power (i.e. "The Ultimate Resource") which allows for the perpetuation of human activities for practically unlimited time. For example, before copper ore became scarce and prices soared due to global increasing demand for copper wires and cablings, the global data and telecommunication networks have switched to glass fiber backbone networks.

This and other quotations in Wired are supposed to be the reason for Bjørn Lomborg's The Skeptical Environmentalist. Lomborg has stated that he began his research as an attempt to counter what he saw as Simons' anti-ecological arguments but changed his mind after starting to analyze the data.

Herman Daly, an American ecological and Georgist economist, criticized Simon for committing profound mistakes and exaggerations, for denial of resource finitude and for his views that neither ecology nor entropy exists.

Finiteness of natural resources
Simon criticized the notion that natural resources are finite: 'Incredible as it may seem at first, the term "finite" is not only inappropriate but is downright misleading when applied to natural resources, both from the practical and philosophical points of view. As with many important arguments, the finiteness issue is "just semantic." Yes the semantics of resources scarcity muddle public discussion and bring about wrongheaded policy decisions. [...] The quantity of the services we obtain from copper that will ever be available to use should not be considered finite because there is no method (even in principle) of making an appropriate count of it, given the problem of the economic definition of "copper," the possibility of using copper more efficiently, the possibility of creating copper or its economic equivalent from other materials, the possibility of recycling copper, or even obtaining copper from sources beyond planet Earth, and thus the lack of boundaries to the sources from which "copper" might be drawn.'

Legacy
The Institute for the Study of Labor established the annual Julian L. Simon Lecture to honor Simon's work in population economics. The University of Illinois at Urbana-Champaign held a symposium discussing Simon's work on April 24, 2002. The university also established the Julian Simon Memorial Faculty Scholar Endowment to fund an associate faculty member in the business school. India's Liberty Institute also holds a Julian Simon Memorial Lecture. The Competitive Enterprise Institute gives the Julian Simon Memorial Award annually to an economist in the vein of Simon; the first recipient was Stephen Moore, who had served as a research fellow under Simon in the 1980s.

Personal life
Simon was married to Rita James Simon, who was also a longtime member of the faculty at the University of Illinois at Urbana-Champaign and later became a public affairs professor at American University. Simon suffered for a long time from depression, which allowed him to work only a few productive hours in a day. He also studied psychology of depression and wrote a book on overcoming it. Simon was Jewish. He died of a heart attack at his home in Chevy Chase in 1998 at age 65.

Education
 BA, Harvard University, experimental psychology, 1953
 MBA, University of Chicago, 1959
 PhD, University of Chicago, business economics, 1961

Honors
 Doctor honoris causa, University of Navarra, (Spain), Economics, 1998

Works
 
 
 The Resourceful Earth: A Response to "Global 2000" (1984), Julian Simon & Herman Kahn, eds
 The Economic Consequences of Immigration into the United States
 Effort, Opportunity, and Wealth: Some Economics of the Human Spirit
 Good Mood: The New Psychology of Overcoming Depression  (Forewords by Albert Ellis and Kenneth Colby)
 The Hoodwinking of a Nation  (hard),  (soft)
 A Life Against the Grain: The Autobiography of an Unconventional Economist 
 Scarcity or Abundance? A Debate on the Environment (1994), (with Norman Myers), 
 The Philosophy and Practice of Resampling Statistics
 Basic research methods in social sciences: The art of empirical investigation, 
 Resampling: A Better Way to Teach (and Do) Statistics (with Peter C. Bruce)
 The Science and Art of Thinking Well in Science, Business, the Arts, and Love
 Economics of Population: Key Modern Writings, 
 The State of Humanity, 
 It's Getting Better All the Time : 100 Greatest Trends of the Last 100 Years by Stephen Moore, Julian Lincoln Simon  manuscript finished posthumously by Stephen Moore

References

 
 Julian L. Simon & Herman Kahn eds. (1984) "The Resourceful Earth – A Response to Global 2000" Blackwell 
 Albert A. Bartlett. Reflections on Sustainability, Population Growth, and the Environment (revised version).

Further reading
 Desrochers, Pierre and Vincent Geloso, "Snatching the Wrong Conclusions from the Jaws of Defeat: A Historical/Resourceship Perspective on Paul Sabin's The Bet: Paul Ehrlich, Julian Simon, and Our Gamble over Earth's Future (Yale University Press, 2013), Part 2: The Wager: Protagonists and Lessons." New Perspectives on Political Economy, vol. 12, no. 1-2 (2016), pp. 42–64.
 Desrochers, Pierre and Vincent Geloso, "Snatching the Wrong Conclusions from the Jaws of Defeat: A Historical/Resourceship Perspective on Paul Sabin's The Bet: Paul Ehrlich, Julian Simon, and Our Gamble over Earth's Future (Yale University Press, 2013). Part 1: The Missing History of Thought: Depletionism vs Resourceship." New Perspectives on Political Economy, vol. 12, no. 1-2 (2016), pp. 5–41.

Books critical of Julian Simon:
Ehrlich, Paul R. Betrayal of Science and Reason: How Anti-Environmental Rhetoric Threatens Our Future, 1996. (ISBN 1-55963-483-9)
Grant, Lindsey. Elephants in the Volkswagen, 1992. (ISBN 0-7167-2268-2)
Hardin, Garrett. The Ostrich Factor: Our Population Myopia, 1998. (ISBN 0-19-512274-7)

External links

 Writings by Julian L. Simon, juliansimon.org
 The Ultimate Resource II: People, Materials, and Environment, juliansimon.org
 Julian Simon papers at the University of Maryland libraries
 Liberty Institute First Annual Julian L. Simon Memorial Lecture
 Julian Simon's Bet With Paul Ehrlich
 Julian Simon's bet with David South
 "Julian Simon Remembered: It's A Wonderful Life"
 FMN and Heartland: "Remembering Julian Simon"
 Reason Magazine: "David Foreman vs. the Cornucopians"
 
 MIT Technology Review: Environmental Heresies
 The Julian L. Simon Memorial Award
 MercatorNet: Population
 Julian L. Simon papers at the University of Wyoming – American Heritage Center
 Critique of 'The Ultimate Resource' by Herman Daly, 1991
 Ernest Partridge, "Perilous Optimism", 2007, gadfly.igc.org -- a criticism of Simon and Sagoff; "Prof. Simon's ideas have been universally dismissed by environmental scientists as crackpot, and yet he was something of a hero among libertarians, neo-classical economists, and their political disciples."
 Simon, Julian L., encyclopedia.com
 Simon, Julian (1932-1998), libertarianism.org

1932 births
1998 deaths
American libertarians
20th-century American Jews
American non-fiction environmental writers
Cornucopians
Environmental economists
Harvard University alumni
Libertarian economists
University of Illinois Urbana-Champaign faculty
University of Maryland, College Park faculty
University of Chicago Booth School of Business alumni
20th-century  American economists
Member of the Mont Pelerin Society
Love Canal